The Rhodospirillaceae are a family of Pseudomonadota.  The majority are purple nonsulfur bacteria, producing energy through photosynthesis; originally all purple nonsulfur bacteria were included here.

They are often found in anaerobic aquatic environments, such as mud and stagnant water, although they are able to survive in air.

This family also includes Magnetospirillum, which contains tiny chains of magnetite. These let it sense the Earth's magnetic field, which runs downwards as well as north or south, to return to the bottom of a pond (magnetotaxis).  Similar magnetite chains found in Martian meteorites have been suggested as evidence of life on Mars.

References 

Rhodospirillales